Tasdance is a contemporary dance company based in Launceston, Tasmania, Australia.

It was founded in 1981 as Australia's first dance-in-education company. Since then, Tasdance's activities have broadened to mainstage performances as well as development and engagement programs for dance artists, students and the community.

It received the Group Award at the Sidney Myer Performing Arts Awards for 2007.

References 

Dance companies in Australia
Contemporary dance companies
Culture of Tasmania